Yoann Axel Cyriac Arquin (born 15 April 1988) is a French professional footballer who plays as a centre forward for Wuhan and the Martinique national team.

Club career

France
Arquin started his career with Nancy B.

Hereford United
Former Hereford United striker Guy Ipoua, recommended Arquin to the club in the summer of 2011 and after enjoying a successful trial, Arquin joined Hereford United on a free transfer on 25 July 2011.

Arquin scored his first goal for Hereford on 9 August, in a first round League Cup victory against Brentford. Over the rest of the season he scored 7 more times, including winners against Dagenham & Redbridge and 2 goals in the 3–0 victory over Crawley Town. However his efforts were not enough to prevent Hereford's relegation on the final day of the season to the Football Conference.

People have compared Arquin to former Hereford striker Mathieu Manset, who left the club in January 2011, to join Reading.

Notts County
After leaving Hereford in the summer, Arquin became Notts County's 8th signing in preparation for the 2012–13 season on 11 July 2012. He signed a one-year contract, with the option of an extra 12 months. He scored his first goal in the 2–2 friendly against rivals Nottingham Forest on 7 August 2012. He made his competitive debut for Notts County in the Capital One League Cup game against Bradford City. In his league debut Arquin scored to make it 2–0 against Crewe but minutes later got sent off for kicking out at Ashley Westwood. Arquin made his return to league action against Shrewsbury Town where his superb run set up Lee Hughes to score the winning goal. He then scored a brace in a 3–0 win over Portsmouth. Arquin scored his fourth goal for the club against Coventry with a fine curling effort to put his team 2–0 up. After going over 5 games without a goal, Arquin finally scored his ninth goal for the club in a 3–1 win over Colchester after he headed in from a corner. He finished the 2012–13 season as Notts County's top goalscorer picking up the Golden Boot award at the end of season ceremony. Arquin also picked up the goal of the season award for his stunning volley against Rotherham United.

Arquin scored his first goal of the 2013–14 season in a 4–2 defeat to Peterborough United. In the next game against Walsall, he came off the bench and headed in Alan Sheehan's cross to equalise the scores. The match finished 1–1 and secured Notts County's first point of the season. On 27 August 2013, he scored a header against Liverpool in a 4–2 defeat at Anfield in the League Cup.

Ross County
On 15 January 2014, Arquin joined Scottish club Ross County on a 1-year contract. He scored a goal on his debut in a home match against Dundee United on 18 January 2014, in what was a 3–0 win for the hosts.

Arquin left Ross County when his contract expired on 2 January 2015.

St Mirren
On 14 January 2015, Arquin signed for St Mirren until the end of season 2014–15. Arquin received a straight red card after 37 minutes of his debut, a 2–1 away victory against his previous club Ross County, on 17 January 2015 – however on appeal this was later reduced to a yellow card. Arquin left Saints on 29 May 2015 after an unsuccessful spell with the club, making 12 appearances and scoring no goals.

1461 Trabzon
On 22 July 2015, Arquin signed a two-year contract for Turkish club 1461 Trabzon who play in the TFF First League.

Syrianska FC
On 27 July 2016, Arquin signed a rest-of the-season contract for Swedish club Syrianska FC who play in Superettan.

Mansfield Town
Arquin returned to English football in December 2016, joining Mansfield Town. He was released by Mansfield at the end of the 2016–17 season.

Kaisar
In January 2018, Arquin went on trial with Kazakhstan Premier League club FC Kaisar, signing a one-year contract with them on 28 January 2018.

Yeovil Town
On 2 August 2018, Arquin signed for League Two side Yeovil Town on a six-month contract following a successful trial. At the end of the 2018–19 season, Arquin was released by Yeovil following the club's relegation from the Football League.

Style of play
Arquin is a strong player known to be good in the air and comfortable using both feet. Notts County defender Dean Leacock likened Arquin to Nicolas Anelka. "A lot of us call him Anelka because he's got so much skill – and he's quite stroppy too!".

Career statistics

Club

International

International goals
As of match played 15 July 2017. Martinique score listed first, score column indicates score after each Arquin goal.

References

External links

1988 births
Living people
Footballers from Le Havre
French footballers
Martiniquais footballers
Martinique international footballers
Association football forwards
AS Nancy Lorraine players
FC Nantes players
Quimper Kerfeunteun F.C. players
Paris Saint-Germain F.C. players
Red Star F.C. players
Hereford United F.C. players
Notts County F.C. players
Ross County F.C. players
St Mirren F.C. players
1461 Trabzon footballers
Syrianska FC players
Mansfield Town F.C. players
FC Kaisar players
Yeovil Town F.C. players
Heilongjiang Ice City F.C. players
Wuhan F.C. players
Championnat National 2 players
English Football League players
Scottish Professional Football League players
TFF First League players
Superettan players
Kazakhstan Premier League players
China League One players
Chinese Super League players
2013 CONCACAF Gold Cup players
2014 Caribbean Cup players
2017 CONCACAF Gold Cup players
French expatriate footballers
Expatriate footballers in England
Expatriate footballers in Scotland
Expatriate footballers in Turkey
Expatriate footballers in Sweden
Expatriate footballers in Kazakhstan
Expatriate footballers in China